The Hartmann number (Ha) is the ratio of electromagnetic force to the viscous force, first introduced by Julius Hartmann (18811951) of Denmark. It is frequently encountered in fluid flows through magnetic fields. It is defined by:

 
where
 B is the magnetic field intensity 
 L is the characteristic length scale
 σ is the electrical conductivity
 μ is the dynamic viscosity

See also

 Magnetohydrodynamics

References

Further reading

  Hartmann number is indicated by letter M in analogy with Mach number for aerodynamics.

Dimensionless numbers of fluid mechanics
Fluid dynamics
Magnetohydrodynamics